Exilisia flavicincta is a moth of the subfamily Arctiinae. It was described by Hervé de Toulgoët in 1965. It is found on Madagascar.

References

Lithosiini
Endemic fauna of Madagascar
Moths described in 1965
Moths of Africa